Adolfo Bolea Sanz (24 March 1933 – 14 November 2020) was a Spanish football forward and manager.

In a career spent mostly with Cádiz, he played 309 games and scored 115 goals in Segunda División, adding three in six in La Liga for Español. He also managed Cádiz in two brief spells.

Playing career
Born in El Poble-sec, Barcelona, Catalonia, Bolea began his career at UE Sant Andreu in 1951–52, making his debut on 30 September 1951 in an 8–0 Segunda División loss at Racing Ferrol. In his fourth game, on 21 October, he scored his first goal, equalising for a 1–1 home draw against CA Osasuna. He finished the season with eight goals, hitting 13 in 29 appearances in the following campaign – including his first hat-trick, in a 4–1 home win over Caudal Deportivo – as the team ranked in eighth place and suffered administrative relegation.

Bolea was then sold to RCD Español of La Liga, but loaned back down to CD Tenerife. He scored three times in a 6–1 victory against UD Melilla on 18 October 1953, and added four more on 20 December 1953 in an 8–0 undoing of RCD Mallorca. He was then lent to Sabadell in summer 1954, before returning in November for his only experience outside the second tier; he netted three goals in six top-flight matches, including on 6 February 1955 when he struck twice in a 4–1 defeat of Hércules CF at the Sarrià Stadium.

At the end of the season, Bolea returned to the second division where he would remain until his professional retirement at the age of 31, signing for UD España of Tangier during the Spanish protectorate in Morocco. On 11 September 1955, in his very first appearance, he scored a hat-trick in a 4–2 win against Granada CF, and finished his first year with a career-best 20 goals from 29 games, but the club was merged into Algeciras CF when the city returned to Moroccan rule in 1956.

Bolea then crossed the Straits of Gibraltar and passed the final eight seasons of his career in the same league for Cádiz CF, leaving the Estadio Ramón de Carranza at the age of 31.

Coaching career
Bolea was player-coach at amateurs Balón de Cádiz during the 1964–65 season, and remained as manager for a further six years. He returned to Cádiz in 1971 as assistant, and shortly afterwards served as interim.  

In 1974, Bolea was appointed at the newly founded Cádiz B, achieving promotion to the first regional division. He signed with Racing Club Portuense before the end of the campaign, and his role with the reserves was assumed by his assistant Luis Escarti.

Bolea returned to Cádiz as interim manager during the second part of 1975–76. Taking over at a critical time, he managed to avoid relegation from the second tier. However, he was affected by illness and was not appointed to the permanent position, which went to Escarti.  

After two years with Cádiz's B side, Bolea's final position as manager was at CD San Fernando in the 1982–83 season.

Death
Bolea died on 14 November 2020 at the age of 87, in Cádiz.

References

External links

Stats and bio at Cadistas1910 

1933 births
2020 deaths
Footballers from Barcelona
Spanish footballers
Association football forwards
La Liga players
Segunda División players
UE Sant Andreu footballers
CD Tenerife players
CE Sabadell FC footballers
RCD Espanyol footballers
Cádiz CF players
Spanish expatriate sportspeople in Morocco
Spanish football managers
Segunda División managers
Segunda División B managers
Cádiz CF managers